The comarcal council (Catalan: consell comarcal, Galician: consello comarcal, Spanish: consejo comarcal), also somewhat misleadingly referred to as county council, is a local administration and government body in the comarcas of some parts of Spain, mostly in the  Spanish Autonomous Communities of Catalonia, Aragon and the Basque Country.

The comarcal council is normally constituted by  representatives of the municipalities within the comarcal demarcation, who are elected according to some defined mechanisms given by a promulgated law.

The Comarca of Barcelonès is the only comarca without a comarcal council.

Bibliography

See also 
 Local government in Spain
 Comarcas of Spain

Politics of Catalonia